Associazione Calcio Fiorentina had its best season for a long time, finishing tied for third in Serie A, plus winning the Coppa Italia following a clear double victory over Atalanta in the final. Strengthened by Stefan Schwarz and Michele Serena, Fiorentina were able to concede fewer goals than previously, but even though Rui Costa and Gabriel Batistuta continued their special partnership, the goals did not come with such ease as the year before.

Players

Transfers

Competitions

Serie A

League table

Results summary

Results by round

Matches

Coppa Italia

Second round

Eightfinals

Quarterfinals

Semifinals

Final

Statistics

Players statistics

Goalscorers
  Gabriel Batistuta 19 (2)
  Francesco Baiano 11 (1)
  Anselmo Robbiati 6
  Giacomo Banchelli 4
  Rui Costa 4 (1)

References

ACF Fiorentina seasons
Fiorentina